Juan Carlos Pastor (born 18 May 1968) is a Spanish handball coach for SC Pick Szeged and the Egyptian national team.

References

1968 births
Living people
Sportspeople from Valladolid
Spanish handball coaches
Handball coaches of international teams